Tom Lynch had the idea for the first London Ambulance Cycle Response Unit (CRU),  with the aim of providing emergency response by bicycle in areas which would be difficult or impossible to get to  in a traditional ambulance.  A trial of the idea was set up in 1999 in the West End of London.   

Lynch's connections to the  bicycle industry enabled him to contribute to the design of the bikes used in the trial, an example of which can be seen in the Medicine Wellcome Galleries at the Science Museum, London.  

The trial was a success and the London CRU expanded  to Heathrow Airport in 2004, the City of London in 2006 and  Kensington and Knightsbridge, Croydon town centre, Canary Wharf and the area around St Pancras International station in 2008.

Since then other cities in the UK have also set up CRUs.

Early life 

Lynch had an accident at school when he was 11 years old and remembers the calmness of the ambulance crew.  

Lynch rode bikes in the hills where he grew up, progressing to motocross bikes and then to BMX in the early 1980s.

Careers

BMX 
Lynch started winning BMX competitions at the age of 16 and over a period of nearly 15 years won many British and international championships, including in the elite superclass. He was the first official British BMX cycling coach.

London Ambulance Service 

In the  early 1990s, following his BMX career, Lynch trained with the patient transport services  at the London Ambulance Service. He then also trained as an Emergency Medical Technician.  He  now works as Cycle Response Unit (CRU) Operations Officer at London Ambulance Service HQ in Waterloo (Cycle Team Hub).

Cycle Response Bicycles 
Cycle Response Units originally used cycle response bicycles based on a mountain bike, painted bright yellow and fitted with blue lights and a siren.

Cycle Responders 
Cycle responders carry life saving equipment on the bike, weighing a total of about 23kgs.They wear specialist clothing and usually have special bike training. The BMX helmet, used by Lynch as part of his CRU uniform, can be seen in the Medicine Wellcome Galleries at the Science Museum, London.

Cycle responders resolve over 50 per cent of all incidents at the scene, their average response time to calls is six minutes and they can cycle 100km in a single 10/12-hour shift.

Awards 
Lynch was awarded an MBE in the 2007 New Years Honours  for services to Bicycle Moto Cross (BMX) racing and Ambulance Service Cycling.

References 

Cycling
BMX
Emergency medical responders
1970 births
Living people